In operator theory, a branch of mathematics, every Banach algebra can be associated with a group called its abstract index group.

Definition 
Let A be a Banach algebra and G the group of invertible elements in A. The set G is open and a topological group. Consider the identity component 

G0,

or in other words the connected component containing the identity 1 of A; G0 is a normal subgroup of G. The quotient group 

ΛA = G/G0 

is the abstract index group of A. Because G0, being the component of an open set, is both open and closed in G, the index group is a discrete group.

Examples 

Let L(H) be the Banach algebra of bounded operators on a Hilbert space. The set of invertible elements in L(H) is path connected. Therefore, ΛL(H) is the trivial group.

Let T denote the unit circle in the complex plane. The algebra C(T) of continuous functions from T to the complex numbers is a Banach algebra, with the topology of uniform convergence. A function in C(T) is invertible (meaning that it has a pointwise multiplicative inverse, not that it is an invertible function) if it does not map any element of T to zero. The group G0 consists of elements homotopic, in G, to the identity in G, the constant function 1. One can choose the functions  fn(z) = zn as representatives in G of distinct homotopy classes of maps T→T. Thus the index group ΛC(T) is the set of homotopy classes, indexed by the winding number of its members. Thus ΛC(T) is isomorphic to the fundamental group of T. It is a countable discrete group.

The Calkin algebra K is the quotient C*-algebra of L(H) with respect to the compact operators. Suppose π is the quotient map. By Atkinson's theorem, an invertible elements in K is of the form π(T) where T is a Fredholm operators. The index group ΛK is again a countable discrete group. In fact, ΛK is isomorphic to the additive group of integers Z, via the Fredholm index. In other words, for Fredholm operators, the two notions of index coincide.

References 
 Zhu, Kehe (1993). An Introduction to Operator Algebras, CRC Press, Boca Raton, LA, 

Operator theory
Banach algebras
Discrete groups